Hett is a large hamlet in County Durham, England. It is situated a few miles south of Durham. Hett is largely surrounded by farmland. To the south, rape fields are predominant while at the northern end, cattle are grazed all year round. To the north-west of Hett lies Sunderland Bridge, a small hamlet with a population of under 50 people (2004). Hett contains a small pond and a football pitch. It is believed to derive its name from its topography - the village sits on a low rounded hill shaped like a hat (Hætt in old English).

Hett gives its name to an igneous dyke which cuts through the local Coal Measures rocks.

References

Villages in County Durham